Mosaic Select 16: Andrew Hill is a compilation album by American pianist Andrew Hill. Except for six tracks, issued on One for One in 1975, it features previously unreleased pieces originally recorded for Blue Note Records.

Track listing
All compositions by Andrew Hill.

CD 1
"Without Malice" - 4:52
"Ocho Rios" [First Version] - 10:29
"Diddy Wah" - 6:50
"Ode to Infinity" - 4:52
"The Dance" - 5:34
"Satin Lady" - 7:59
"Ocho Rios" [Second Version] - 7:33
"Monkash" - 6:30
"Mahogany" - 6:53

CD 2
"Illusion" - 7:00
"Poinsettia" - 6:24
"Fragments" - 5:03
"Soul Mate" - 6:21
"Illusion" [Alternate Take] - 6:30
"Interfusion" - 7:26
"Resolution" - 6:24
"Chained" - 5:40
"MOMA" - 5:35
"Nine at the Bottom" - 5:52
"Six at the Top" - 9:10
"Nine at the Bottom" [Alternate Take] - 6:15

CD 3
"For Blue People Only" - 9:37
"Enamorado" - 6:09
"Mother's Tale" - 9:30
"Oriba" [First Version] - 5:40
"Oriba" [Second Version] - 6:14
"Awake" - 7:08
"Now" - 4:43
"I" - 7:27
"Yomo" - 10:04
"Prevue" - 6:17

Personnel
CD 1 tracks 2-3, 5
Andrew Hill – piano
Charles Tolliver - trumpet
Pat Patrick – flute (2), alto clarinet (3), alto saxophone (2), baritone saxophone (5)
Bennie Maupin – flute, tenor saxophone
Ron Carter - bass
Paul Motian - drums

CD 1 tracks 1, 4, 6-7
Andrew Hill – piano
Charles Tolliver - trumpet, flugelhorn
Pat Patrick – flute (2), alto clarinet (3), alto saxophone (1-2)
Bennie Maupin – flute, tenor saxophone, bass clarinet
Ron Carter - bass
Ben Riley - drums

CD 1 tracks 8-9
Andrew Hill – piano
Carlos Garnett - tenor sax
Richard Davis - bass
Freddie Waits - drums
Sanford Allen - violin
Selwart Clarke, Booker Rowe - viola
Kermit Moore - cello

CD 2 tracks 1-5
Andrew Hill – piano
Bennie Maupin - tenor sax, flute
Ron Carter - bass
Mickey Roker - drums
Sanford Allen - violin
Selwart Clarke, Al Brown - viola
Kermit Moore - cello

CD 2 tracks 6-12
Andrew Hill – piano, soprano sax (11), organ (7, 10, 12)
Ron Carter - bass
Teddy Robinson - drums

CD 3 tracks 1-5
Andrew Hill – piano
Woody Shaw - trumpet
Sam Rivers - soprano and tenor sax
Howard Johnson - baritone sax, tuba
Robin Kenyatta – alto sax
Herbie Lewis - bass
Teddy Robinson- drums

CD 3 tracks 6-10
Andrew Hill – piano, organ (9, 10)
Sam Rivers - soprano and tenor sax, flute
Robin Kenyatta – alto sax
Cecil McBee - bass
Teddy Robinson- drums
Nadi Qamar (Spaulding Givens) - thumb piano, African drum, bells

References

Blue Note Records compilation albums
Andrew Hill albums
2005 compilation albums
Albums recorded at Van Gelder Studio
Albums produced by Alfred Lion